Will Wand (born 31 December 2001) is an English professional rugby union player for Coventry in the RFU Championship. His usual position is centre, but he can also play on the wing.

Early life 
Wand joined Spalding RFC at the age of 4 and progressed through the age ranks. He also attended Spalding Grammar School before leaving for Brooksby Melton College to continue playing in the ACE league.

Personal life 
Wand has a younger brother, Tom, who currently plays in the Leicester Tigers academy as a loosehead prop.

Career

Cambridge 
Wand made his debut for Cambridge in September 2021, after signing for the club a month prior, in a National League 1 match against Rams RFC at 19 years old.

On 11th December 2021, Wand earned his first start of the season in his favoured position of outside centre and was named man of the match after scoring two tries against league leaders Rosslyn Park and received National 1 player of the week shortly after.

He finished the 2021-22 season with 20 appearances and 7 tries.

Coventry 
After an impressive debut senior season in National League 1, Wand earned a move to Championship club Coventry ahead of the 2022-23 season.

On 9th September 2022, Wand made his Championship debut for Coventry at home against Bedford Blues.

Career statistics

References

External links 
Itsrugby Profile

Ultimate Rugby Profile

Statbunker Profile

2001 births
Living people
English rugby union players
Cambridge R.U.F.C. players
Rugby union players from Lincolnshire
Rugby union players from Spalding, Lincolnshire
Coventry R.F.C. players
Rugby union centres